Roland Freisler (30 October 1893 – 3 February 1945), a German Nazi jurist, judge, and politician, served as the State Secretary of the Reich Ministry of Justice from 1934 to 1942 and as President of the People's Court from 1942 to 1945.

As a prominent ideologist of Nazism, he influenced the Nazification of Germany's legal system as a jurist. He attended the Wannsee Conference, the 1942 event which set the Holocaust in motion. He was appointed President of the People's Court in 1942, overseeing the prosecution of political crimes as a judge, and became known for his aggressive personality, his humiliation of defendants, and frequent use of the death penalty in sentencing.

Although the death penalty was abolished with the creation of the  Federal Republic in 1949, Freisler's 1941 definition of  murder in German law, as opposed to the less severe crime of killing, survives  in the Strafgesetzbuch § 211.

Early life
Roland Freisler was born on 30 October 1893 in Celle, Lower Saxony, the son of Julius Freisler (born 20 August 1862 in Klantendorf, Moravia), an engineer and teacher, and Charlotte Auguste Florentine Schwerdtfeger (30 April 1863 in Celle – 20 March 1932 in Kassel). He was baptized as a Protestant on 13 December 1893. He had a younger brother, Oswald, and another brother who was a doctor.

World War I
Freisler was attending law school at Kiel University upon the outbreak of World War I in 1914, which interrupted his studies. He saw active service in the German Imperial Army during the war after enlisting as an officer cadet in 1914 with the Ober-Elsässisches Infanterie-Regiment Nr.167 in Kassel, and by 1915 he was a lieutenant. Whilst in the front-line with the 22nd Division, he was awarded the Iron Cross both 2nd and 1st Class for heroism in action. In October 1915, he was wounded in action on the Eastern Front and taken prisoner of war by Russian forces.

While a prisoner, Freisler learned to speak Russian and developed an interest in Marxism after the Russian Revolution had commenced. The Bolshevik provisional authority which took over responsibility for Freisler's prisoner of war camp made use of him as a "Commissar" (as he was described by them in his repatriated prisoner of war paperwork in 1918) administratively organizing the camp's food supplies from 1917 to 1918. It is possible that, after the Russian prisoner of war camps were emptying in 1918, with their internees being repatriated to Germany after the Armistice between Russia and the Central Powers had been signed, Freisler for a brief period became attached in some way to the Red Guards, though this is not supported by any known documentary evidence.  

According to historian Georg Franz–Willig's Ursprung der Hitlerbewegung 3 volume set published by Schütz, Pr. Oldendorf, 1974, the SDP newspaper Vörwarts' of 3 May 1924 ran an article entitled SPIRITUAL KINSHIP: JEWISH–COMMUNIST, POPULAR REICHSTAG CANDIDATE, in which it stated that Freisler had been 'until rather recently a member of the German Communist Party' and that this was interesting because "his grandmother was a full Jewess."' 

Another possibility is that after the Russian Revolution the description "Commissar" was merely an administrative title given by the Bolshevik authority for anyone employed in an administrative post in the prison camps without the political connotations that the title later acquired. However, in the early days of his Nazi Party career in the 1920s, Freisler was a part of the movement's left wing. 

In the late 1930s, during Joseph Stalin's Great Purge in the Soviet Union, Freisler attended the Moscow Trials to watch the proceedings against the condemned. Freisler later rejected any insinuation that he had ever co-operated with the Soviets, the ideological nemesis of Nazi Germany, but his subsequent career as a political official in Germany was overshadowed by rumours about his time as a "Commissar" with the "Reds".

Post-war legal career
He returned to Germany in 1919 to complete his law studies at the University of Jena, and qualified as a Doctor of Law in 1922. From 1924, he worked as a solicitor in Kassel, and was also elected as a city councillor as a member of the Völkisch-Sozialer Block ("People's Social Block"), an ultranationalist splinter party. He joined the Nazi Party in July 1925 as Member #9679, and gained authority immediately within the organisation by using his legal training to defend members of it who were regularly facing prosecutions for acts of political violence. As the Party transitioned from a fringe political beer-hall and street fighting movement into a political party, Freisler was elected to the Prussian Landtag, and later he became a Member of the Reichstag.

In 1927, Karl Weinrich, a Nazi member of the Prussian Landtag along with Freisler, characterised his reputation in the rapidly expanding Nazi movement in the late 1920s: "Rhetorically Freisler is equal to our best speakers, if not superior; particularly on the broad masses he has influence, but thinking people mostly reject him. Party Comrade Freisler is usable as only a speaker though and is unsuitable for any position of authority because of his unreliablity and moodiness."

Career in Nazi Germany
In February 1933, after Hitler had seized power over the German state, Freisler was appointed Ministerial Director in the Prussian Ministry of Justice. He was Secretary of State in the Prussian Ministry of Justice in 1933–1934, and in the Reich Ministry of Justice from 1934 to 1942. On the founding of the Academy for German Law by Hans Frank, Freisler was made a member and the chairman of its Criminal Law Committee.

Freisler's mastery of legal texts, mental agility, dramatic courtroom verbal dexterity and verbal force, in combination with his zealous conversion to Nazi ideology, made him the most feared judge in Nazi Germany, and the personification of Nazism in domestic law. However, despite his talents and loyalty, Adolf Hitler never appointed him to any post beyond the legal system. That might have been because he was a lone figure, lacking support within the senior echelons of the Nazi hierarchy, but he had also been politically compromised by his brother, Oswald Freisler, also a lawyer. Oswald had acted as a defence counsel against the regime's authority several times during the increasingly politically driven trials by which the Nazis sought to enforce their tyrannical control of German society, and he had the habit of wearing his Nazi Party membership badge in court whilst doing so. Propaganda minister Joseph Goebbels reproached Oswald Freisler and reported his actions to Adolf Hitler who, in response, ordered Freisler's expulsion from the Party. (Oswald Freisler died, allegedly by committing suicide, in 1939.) 

In 1941, in a discussion at the "Führer Headquarters" about whom to appoint to replace Franz Gürtner, the Reich Justice Minister, who had died, Goebbels suggested Roland Freisler as an option; Hitler's reply, referring to Freisler's alleged "Red" past, was: "That old Bolshevik? No!"

Contribution to the Nazification of the law
Freisler was a committed Nazi ideologist, and used his legal skills to adapt its theories into practical law-making and judicature. He published a paper entitled Die rassebiologische Aufgabe bei der Neugestaltung des Jugendstrafrechts ("The racial-biological task involved in the reform of juvenile criminal law"). In this document he argued that "racially foreign, racially degenerate, racially incurable or seriously defective juveniles" should be sent to juvenile centres or correctional education centres and segregated from those who are "German and racially valuable".

He strongly advocated the creation of laws to punish Rassenschande ("race defilement", the Nazi term for sexual relations between "Aryans" and "inferior races"), to be classed as "racial treason". Freisler looked to racist laws in the United States as a model for Nazi legislation to target Jews in Germany. Freisler considered American Jim Crow racist legislation "primitive" for failing to provide a legal definition of the term black or negro person. Nevertheless, while some more conservative Nazi lawyers objected to the lack of precision with which a person could be defined as a "Jew," he argued that American judges were able to identify black people for purposes of laws in American states that prohibited "miscegenation" between black and white people, and laws that otherwise codified racial segregation, and, therefore, German laws could similarly target Jews even if the term "Jew" could not be given a precise legal definition.

In 1933, he published a pamphlet calling for the legal prohibition of "mixed-blood" sexual intercourse, which met with expressions of public unease in the dying elements of the German free press and non-Nazi political classes and, at the time, lacked public authorization from the policy of the Nazi Party, which had only just obtained dictatorial control of the state. It also led to a clash with his superior Franz Gürtner, but Freisler's ideological views reflected things to come, as was shown by the enactment of the Nuremberg Laws within two years.

In October 1939, he introduced the concept of 'precocious juvenile criminal' in the "Juvenile Felons Decree". This "provided the legal basis for imposing the death penalty and penitentiary terms on juveniles for the first time in German legal history." Between 1933 and 1945, the Reich's Courts sentenced at least 72 German juveniles to death, among them 17-year-old Helmuth Hübener, found guilty of high treason for distributing anti-war leaflets in 1942.

On the outbreak of World War II, Freisler issued a legal "Decree against National Parasites" (September 1939) introducing the term perpetrator type, which was used in combination with another Nazi ideological term, parasite. The adoption of racial biological terminology into law portrayed juvenile criminality as 'parasitical', implying the need for harsher sentences to remedy it. He justified the new concept with: "in times of war, breaches of loyalty and baseness cannot find any leniency and must be met with the full force of the law."

Wannsee Conference
On 20 January 1942, Freisler, representing the Reich Minister Franz Schlegelberger, attended the Wannsee Conference of senior governmental officials in a villa on the southwestern outskirts of Berlin to provide expert legal advice for the planning of the destruction of European Jewry.

Presidency of the People's Court

On 20 August 1942, Hitler promoted Otto Georg Thierack to Reich Justice Minister, replacing the retiring Schlegelberger, and named Freisler to succeed Thierack as president of the People's Court (Volksgerichtshof). This court had jurisdiction over a broad array of political offences, including black marketeering, work slowdowns and defeatism. These actions were viewed by Freisler as Wehrkraftzersetzung (undermining defensive capability) and were punished severely, with many death sentences. The People's Court under Freisler's domination almost always sided with the prosecuting authority, to the point that being brought before it was tantamount to a capital charge. Its separate administrative existence beyond the ordinary judicial system, despite its  trappings, rapidly turned it into an executive execution arm and psychological domestic terror weapon of Nazi Germany's totalitarian regime, in the tradition of a revolutionary tribunal rather than a court of law.

He chaired the First Senate of the People's Court wearing a blood scarlet judicial robe, in a hearing chamber bedecked with scarlet swastika-draped banners and a large black sculpted bust of Adolf Hitler's head upon a high pedestal behind his chair, opening each hearing session with the Nazi salute from the bench. He acted as prosecutor, judge and jury combined, and also as his own recorder, thereby controlling the record of the written grounds for the sentences that he passed.

The frequency of death sentences rose sharply under Freisler's rule. Approximately 90% of all cases that came before him ended in guilty verdicts. Between 1942 and 1945, more than 5,000 death sentences were decreed by him, 2,600 of these through the court's First Senate, which Freisler controlled. He was responsible in his three years on the court for as many death sentences as all other senate sessions of the court combined in the court's existence between 1934 and 1945.

Freisler became known during this period for berating each member of the steady stream of defendants passing before him. He was known to be interested in Andrei Vyshinsky, the Chief Prosecutor of the Soviet purge trials, and had attended those show-trials to watch Vyshinsky's courtroom performances in a similar capacity in Moscow in 1938.

White Rose show-trials
On February 18, 1943, Sophie Scholl and Hans Scholl were captured by the Gestapo. Through questioning, it became clear that the two siblings were part of a resistance group called the White Rose that was attempting to sow discord in Germany by the use of mailing pamphlets urging passive resistance. On February 22, 1943, Freisler was flown into Munich for the sole purpose of presiding over their “trial”. The verdict was as expected: Guilty. Freisler had sentenced them to death by hanging, but fearful of them being raised to martyrdom status if they were publicly killed, it was decided to kill them by Guillotine.

On April 19, 1943, Freisler was flown back again to stand as judge over the second trial of the White Rose members. Out of the thirteen defendants, three were sentenced to death, nine were given prison sentences, and one was acquitted.

20 July Plot show-trials

In August 1944, some of the arrested perpetrators of the failed assassination of Adolf Hitler were brought before Freisler for punishment. The proceedings were filmed in order to be shown to the German public in cinema newsreels, and portray how Freisler ran his court; he would often alternate between questioning the defendants in an analytical manner, then suddenly launch into a furious verbal tirade, even going so far as to shout insults at the accused from the bench. The shift from cold, clinical interrogation to fits of screaming rage was designed to psychologically disarm, torment and humiliate those on trial, while discouraging any attempt on their part to defend or justify their actions. At one point, Freisler yelled at Field Marshal Erwin von Witzleben, who was trying to hold up his trousers after having purposely been given old, oversized and beltless clothing: "You dirty old man, why do you keep fiddling with your trousers?"

Another instance is from Freisler's public appearance during the trial of defendant Ulrich-Wilhelm Graf Schwerin von Schwanenfeld. The footage taken shows Freisler drowning out Schwerin's weak and muted testimony, prompted by his concern over the Wehrmacht's "numerous murders in Poland", by roaring at him in an exaggerated and theatrical manner, declaring "Sie sind ja ein schäbiger Lump!" (roughly, "You really are a lousy piece of trash!").

Nearly all of the accused were sentenced to death by hanging, with some of the sentences being carried out within two hours of the verdict being delivered.

Death
On the morning of 3 February 1945, Freisler was conducting a Saturday session of the People's Court when United States Army Air Forces bombers attacked Berlin, led by the B-17 of Lieutenant Colonel Robert Rosenthal. Government and Nazi Party buildings were hit, including the Reich Chancellery, the Gestapo headquarters, the Party Chancellery and the People's Court. Hearing the air raid sirens, Freisler hastily adjourned the court and ordered that the prisoners before him be taken to an air raid shelter, but stayed behind to gather files before leaving. A bomb struck the court-building at 11:08, causing a partial internal collapse, and a masonry column came loose whilst Freisler was distracted by his documents. The column came crashing down on Freisler, causing him to be crushed and killed instantly. Due to the column collapsing, a large portion of the courtroom also landed on Freisler's corpse. 

Among the files was that of Fabian von Schlabrendorff, a 20 July Plot member who was on trial that day and facing execution. The flattened remains of Freisler were found beneath the rubble still clutching the files he had stopped to retrieve. A differing account stated that Freisler "was killed by a bomb fragment while trying to escape from his law court to the air-raid shelter," and "bled to death on the pavement outside the People's Court at Bellevuestrasse 15 in Berlin". Von Schlabrendorff was "standing near Freisler when the latter met his end". Von Schlabrendorff was re-tried, acquitted, and survived the war, and ultimately followed Freisler as a judge, on the Federal Constitutional Court. 

A foreign correspondent reported, "Apparently nobody regretted his death". Luise Jodl, wife of General Alfred Jodl, recounted more than 25 years later that she had been working at the Lützow Hospital when Freisler's body was brought in, and that a worker commented, "It is God's verdict." According to Mrs. Jodl: "Not one person said a word in reply." His body was buried in the grave of his wife's family at the Waldfriedhof Dahlem Cemetery in Berlin. His name is not recorded on the gravestone.

Personal life

He married Marion Russegger on 24 March 1928; the couple had two sons, Harald and Roland.

Freisler in film and fiction
Freisler appears in a fictionalized form in the Hans Fallada novel Every Man Dies Alone (1947). In 1943 he tried and handed down death penalties to Otto and Elise Hampel, who were both guillotined for distributing anti-Nazi postcards, and whose true story inspired Fallada's novel.

In the novel Fatherland (1992) by Robert Harris, which takes place in an alternate 1964 in which Nazi Germany won World War II, Freisler is mentioned as having survived until winter 1954, when he is killed by a maniac with a knife on the steps of the Berlin People's Court. It is implied that his death was actually caused by the Gestapo, to ensure that the Wannsee Conference and the Holocaust remained a secret.

See also
Hanging judge
Kangaroo court
Hans Frank
Harry Haffner
 Lt. Col. Robert Rosenthal
Carl Schmitt
Günther Vollmer
Helmuth James Graf von Moltke

Notes

References

Bibliography
Breuning, Stephan. Roland Freisler: Rechtsideologien im III. Reich. Neuhegelianismus kontra Hegel ("Legal ideologies in the Third Reich. Neo-Hegelianism contra Hegel") Hamburg, Kovac 2002, .
Buchheit, Gert. Richter in roter Robe. Freisler, Präsident des Volksgerichtshofes ("Judges in Red Robes. Freisler, President of the People's Court") München, 1968.
Geerling, Wayne. "Protecting the National Community From Juvenile Delinquency: Nazification of Juvenile Criminal Law in the Third Reich", a chapter from the author's dissertation Resistance as High Treason: Juvenile Resistance in the Third Reich, Melbourne University, 2001. Read it here

Knopp, Guido. Hitler's Hitmen (Ch. 4, "The Hanging Judge"). Stroud, UK: Sutton Publishing, 2002.
Koch, H. W. In the Name of the Volk: Political Justice in Hitler's Germany London, 1989.
Ortner, Helmut. Der Hinrichter. Roland Freisler, Mörder im Dienste Hitlers ("The Executioner. Roland Freisler, Murderer in Hitler's Service") Wien, Zsolnay 1993, .

External links

 20 July 1944 plot—Trials before the People's Court (Volksgerichtshof) -- YouTube video in German—Shows Roland Freisler in action: https://www.youtube.com/watch?v=iQfW6hHWWuM

 - actual footage of Freisler trying a resistance group
 

 
 

1893 births
1945 deaths
Deaths by American airstrikes
Deaths by airstrike during World War II
German civilians killed in World War II
German Army personnel of World War I
German prisoners of war in World War I
Judges in the Nazi Party
Jurists from Lower Saxony
Lawyers in the Nazi Party
Members of the Academy for German Law
Members of the Landtag of Prussia
Members of the Reichstag of Nazi Germany
Nazi Party officials
Nazi Party politicians
People from Celle
People from the Province of Hanover
Politicide perpetrators
Prussian Army personnel
Recipients of the Iron Cross (1914), 1st class
 
University of Jena alumni
World War I prisoners of war held by Russia